Willy Logie (born 17 November 1952) is a retired Belgian professional darts player who competed in the 1980s and 1990s.

He competed in the 1985 BDO World Darts Championship, beating Bob Sinnaeve in the first round before being defeated by Eric Bristow in the second round. His only other World Championship appearance came in 1986 when he lost in the first round to Finland's Kari Saukkonen. He also played in the 1985 Winmau World Masters, losing in the first round to Harry Patterson.

Logie had one ranked title success during his career - by winning the 1985 Swiss Open. He also won the 1986 Spring Cup, an unranked WDF event.

World Championship performances

BDO

1985: Second Round: (lost to Eric Bristow 0–3)
1986: First Round: (lost to Kari Saukkonen 1–3)

External links
Profile darts database

Belgian darts players
Living people
British Darts Organisation players
1952 births